The Burkinabé records in swimming are the fastest ever performances of swimmers from Burkina Faso, which are recognised and ratified by the Fédération Burkinabé de Natation et de Sauvetage.

All records were set in finals unless noted otherwise.

Long Course (50 m)

Men

Women

Short Course (25 m)

Men

Women

References

Burkina Faso
Records
Swimming